Aşıklar can refer to:

 Aşıklar, Ardanuç
 Aşıklar, Ilgaz